Nikolas Wamsteeker (born October 28, 1996) is a retired Canadian ice dancer. With his forner skating partner, Haley Sales, he is the 2020 Bavarian Open bronze medallist and 2018 Lake Placid Ice Dance International bronze medallist. The two placed 9th at the 2018 Four Continents Championships.

Personal life

Wamsteeker was born on October 28, 1996, in Winnipeg, Manitoba. He grew up in Langley, British Columbia.

Skating career

Early years

Wamsteeker began learning to skate in 2000. He competed with Jessica Jiang early in his career. The two advanced to the novice level in the 2011–2012 season but missed the 2012 Canadian Championships due to injury.
After a year away from skating, Wamsteeker teamed up with Jazlyn Tabachniuk in 2013. They placed 6th in the novice ranks at the 2014 Canadian Championships.

Partnership with Sales
Wamsteeker teamed up with Haley Sales in March 2014. They decided to train under Megan Wing and Aaron Lowe in Burnaby, British Columbia. The two placed ninth in the junior event at the 2015 Canadian Championships. The following season, they competed at one ISU Junior Grand Prix event, finishing sixth in Austria, and ranked fourth at the 2016 Canadian Championships.

Sales/Wamsteeker made their senior international debut at the Lake Placid Ice Dance International in late July 2016. They finished seventh in Lake Placid, ninth at the 2016 CS Autumn Classic International, and fifth at the 2017 Canadian Championships.

Competing in their second senior season, Sales/Wamsteeker placed tenth at the 2017 CS Nebelhorn Trophy and 6th at the 2018 Canadian Championships. They were selected to represent Canada at the 2018 Four Continents Championships in Taipei, Taiwan; the duo finished ninth after placing eighth in the short dance and tenth in the free.

They won a bronze medal at the Lake Placid International Dance trophy and then placed fourth at the 2018 U.S. Classic.  They made their Grand Prix debut at the 2018 Skate Canada International, where they placed ninth.  At the 2019 Canadian Championships, they placed a career-best fourth, a placement the replicated the following year despite a fall by Sales in the rhythm dance.

Sales/Wamsteeker were assigned to the 2020 Skate Canada International, but the event was cancelled as a result of the coronavirus pandemic. They placed fourth at the virtually-held 2021 Skate Canada Challenge, while the 2021 Canadian Championships were subsequently cancelled.

In June of 2021, Sales/Wamsteeker announced that they would be moving to train at the Ice Academy of Montreal's campus in London, Ontario, coached by two-time Olympic champion Scott Moir.

In February of 2023, Wamsteeker announced his retirement from competitive ice dance and his decision to become a pilot in the Royal Canadian Air Force.

Programs

With Sales

With Tabachniuk

Competitive highlights 
GP: Grand Prix; CS: Challenger Series; JGP: Junior Grand Prix

Ice dancing with Sales

With Tabachniuk

With Jiang

References

External links 
 

1996 births
Canadian male ice dancers
Living people
21st-century Canadian people